San Valentino in Abruzzo Citeriore is a mountain hill town in the province of Pescara, part of the Abruzzo region in central Italy. 

The town's name comes from St. Valentine and that of the old province in which the town was located, Abruzzo Citeriore.

One of San Valentino's most important architectural landmarks is Castello Farnese.

Culture
In mid-November, the town hosts the Festival of the Cuckolds (Festa dei Cornuti),  a parade honoring or deriding (depending on one's perspective) men with adulterous wives.

References

External links

 Official website 

Cities and towns in Abruzzo
Castles in Italy